Mangelia concinna is a species of sea snail, a marine gastropod mollusk in the family Mangeliidae.

Description
The length of the shell attains 10 mm, its diameter 4 mm.

Distribution
This marine species occurs off the Ryukyus, Japan.

References

External links
 Otia conchologica: A. Gould, Descriptions of Shells and Mollusks from 1839 to 1862
  Tucker, J.K. 2004 Catalog of recent and fossil turrids (Mollusca: Gastropoda). Zootaxa 682:1–1295.
  R.I. Johnson, The Recent Mollusca of Augustus Addison Gould; United States National Museum, bulletin 239, Washington D.C. 1964

concinna
Gastropods described in 1860